Dan Hole Pond is a  water body located in Carroll County in eastern New Hampshire, United States, in the towns of Ossipee and Tuftonboro. The pond is situated on the south side of the Ossipee Mountains. Water exits Dan Hole Pond via the Dan Hole River, part of the Ossipee Lake watershed and ultimately that of the Saco River in Maine.

The lake is classified as a coldwater fishery, with observed species including landlocked salmon, brook trout, lake trout, chain pickerel, and horned pout.

See also

List of lakes in New Hampshire

References

Lakes of Carroll County, New Hampshire